Budafok (literally "Promontory near Buda, or Buda Point") is a neighbourhood in Budapest, Hungary. It is situated in the southwestern part of Buda, near the Danube, and belongs to District XXII. Budafok was an independent municipality before 1950. The village was known for wine and champagne making.

Name

Budafok was for many years known as ‘Promontor’ from the Latin Promontorium, meaning headland, but in 1886, the name was changed to its Hungarian equivalent, Budafok, meaning ‘Buda cape’. In 1950 Budafok was merged into Budapest together with  Nagytétény and Budatétény, forming Budapest’s district XXII.  Budafok-Tétény is the official name of the district which covers 43 square kilometers and contains Budafok proper.

Location

The borders of Budafok are: Ringló út from Horogszegi határsor - Méhész utca - railway line towards Érd - Hosszúréti patak - the Danube (including the islands) - Háros utca - Vöröskúti határsor - Horogszegi határsor.

History

Historically, Budafok was ideal for wine production because of the Tétényi plateau and its slopes along the Danube. Budafok was home to what used to be the most important vineyard of the greater Budapest area as well as Central Hungary. In 1880, with increasing commercial wine production underway, a union of wine producing and bottling industries created a cellar network hollowed out of the limestone beneath Budafok.  The cellar system, 25 kilometers in length and the largest in all of Europe, is still extant today. As such, Budafok is commonly referred to as “Cellar Town.” Today, there is still a huge wine-cellar system with hundred-year old casks; among them the second largest cask in Hungary.  The leading historical oenological site in Budafok is the wine cellars of József Törley & Co which can still be visited. Other wine producers still operating there are Hungarovin Rt, Promontorvin Rt and Budafokvin Kft.
In 1899, Budafok was electrified by the Tiszántúli Áramszolgáltató Rt. (East-Hungarian Power Supply Company Ltd.).

Sister cities
 Kristianstad, Sweden

Notable people
 

 Imre Menyhay (1931–2018), Hungarian-Austrian economist, pedagogue and sociologist.

Landmarks 
 Budafok wine-cellars, 220-hectolitres Seybold-cask (Péter Pál utca 39.)
 Czuba-Durozier Mansion, Sacellary Mansion, Törley Mansion, György Villa
 Saint Leopold Church, St Peter and Paul Chapel, St. Michael Chapel
 Nagyboldogasszony Parsonage
 Törley Champagne Factory Museum (1221 Budapest, Anna utca 5-7).
 Törley Mausoleum (Sarló utca)
 Cave-dwelling Museum (Veréb utca 4)
 St. Christoph Jazz Gallery (Kossuth Lajos utca 88.)

References

External links

Neighbourhoods of Budapest
History of Budapest
Former municipalities of Hungary